John Garrett is a fictional character appearing in American comic books published by Marvel Comics.

The character appears in the Marvel Cinematic Universe TV series Agents of S.H.I.E.L.D., portrayed by Bill Paxton in season one and James Paxton in season seven.

Publication history

John Garrett first appeared in Elektra: Assassin #2 (September 1986), and was created by Frank Miller and Bill Sienkiewicz.

Fictional character biography

John Garrett worked for the CIA and went through special covert training. In 1961, Leonardo da Vinci invited Garrett to the Pieta base in Rome to be a member of the Great Wheel. Leonardo sent Garrett, Vasili Dassiev, Shoji Soma and Daniel Whitehall to Giza to acquire a power source from a Brood vessel after destroying the Brood inside. Garrett approved the idea of using the power source to run the rejuvenations chambers found by another team. He was present when the chambers were stolen by Russian soldiers led by Victor Uvarov and Dassiev where they nearly murdered him.

Garrett served three months at Dannemora for assault. He then served two years in Ryker's Island for larceny. Garrett had a history of resisting arrest. After assaulting a police officer in Kentucky, Garrett was sentenced to six months in a prison farm. After his times in each prison, Garrett was recruited to work for S.H.I.E.L.D. where his criminal records mysteriously vanished. He served in Libya with agent Chastity McBryde. When Chasity discovered that there were no records of Garrett, this gets brought with ExTechOp where Chasity was swiftly transferred to a minor police action in Venezuela and the complaint to Nick Fury was not received.

Garrett has been rebuilt as a cyborg with a six-inch removable portion on his skull (which a recorder can be placed in) and a cybernetic right hand. Three years after the Libya mission, Garrett and his partner Arthur Perry were sent to San Concepcion as part of "Operation: Scrambled Eggs" where they had to investigate the assassination of President Carlos Huevos. Garrett and Arthur interrogated Julio Gonzales confessing to hiring a woman to assassinate Huevos. Then they interrogated a political prisoner who told them about Elektra. During the research on Elektra, Garrett became a victim of a psychic link with Electra where he began to be influenced and manipulated. During Garrett's confrontation with Elektra where Perry was slain, Elektra cut off his hand and blew up the munitions shipments in the harbor building they were in. Garrett's body was recovered by ExTechOp where they began replacing 80% of his body with cybernetics as the S.H.I.E.L.D. engineers successfully replaced Garrett's arms, legs, spine, nervous system, heart, liver and lungs. During this time, Elektra slipped in and stole the recorder implant from Garrett's skull. Hours later, Elektra raided S.H.I.E.L.D.'s information bank and was apprehended by the S.H.I.E.L.D. Agents. After being reactivated, Garrett filed his report on Elektra where he suspects that Elektra's a Russian agent. This report was not believed and Garrett was reprimanded by his superior Dr. Harold Beaker. Later that night, Elektra sunk her psychic claws into Garrett in order to get out of the chamber that she is being kept inert in. As Garrett worked to fight Elektra's control, Elektra got him to shut down the power to her chamber. After Elektra escaped, Garrett made a false report to cover up his involvement in the escape. Garrett then recalled that Elektra was going after Ambassador Reich (who at the time was possessed by the Beast of the Hand). After Elektra sent Garrett on a wild goose chase, Reich transferred the Beast of the Hand into the USA's presidential candidate Ken Wind. When Garrett prepared to return to the United States, Elektra stole his plane ticket and framed him so that the airport security would discover a bag of drugs during a body cavity search.

Upon returning to the United States, Garrett was subjected to rigorous testing before being brought before Fury. Fury told Garrett that his reports are unlikely and has him redo them or find a way to back his outrageous claims. Garrett was sent to offer his protection to Wind. Due to his previous interactions with Elektra, he was able to detect the Beast of the Hand within Wind. When the Hand trapped Elektra's mind in the body of a young girl named Sandy and planned to dispose of, Garrett came to Elektra's rescue where he fought off his fellow S.H.I.E.L.D. Agents Honda and Minelli at the cost of the Hand framing him for the deaths of Honda and Minelli.

Garrett and Elektra fought off the assassins of the Hand and then were confronted by S.H.I.E.L.D. Agents led by Chasity as he tried to warn them that Wind is possessed by the Beast of the Hand. Chasity knocked out Garrett only for Elektra to forcefully enable Garrett to regain his consciousness. Due to Elektra's hallucination tricks, Garrett thought he shot Elektra to free himself only for him to actually shoot McBride. The other S.H.I.E.L.D Agents present were also affected and ended up bringing Garrett and Elektra to a S.H.I.E.L.D. base for treatment. Garrett finally stopped resisting and states that he was Elektra's.

Garrett and Elektra recovered and prepared for their assault on Wind.

While Elektra communed with the Beast of the Hand, Garrett was nearby as they learned that the Beast of the Hand would orchestrate the annihilation of the human race by launching nuclear missile attacks. At a rally held by Wind, Garrett posed as an ice cream vendor as Elektra hid in the shadows waiting for the chance to assassinate Wind.

Garrett's cyborg systems were identified by McBride leading a group of S.H.I.E.L.D. Agents to converge on him. Elektra took out the S.H.I.E.L.D. Agents as a bunch of Hand assassins attacked. Garrett pulled out a rocket launcher from the ice cream stand a fired at Wind only for the shot to be deflected when Chasity shot him in the shoulder. As a result, Wind was placed in an escape module and was airlifted out as Garrett and Elektra had snagged the helicopter. Garrett and Elektra were then assaulted by the rebuilt and Hand-controlled Perry and Chuck the Dwarf who impaled Garrett with a spear. Garrett hurdled a bunch of grenades at the helicopter that Wind was in which caused it to crash into the Lincoln Memorial enough to strike Perry. Emerging from the wreckage, Garrett charged toward Wind only to end up fighting Perry who dismantled Garrett. Elektra managed to destroy Arthur and drive away the Beast of the Wind. It appeared that Elektra transferred Garrett's mind into Wind's body as the President of the United States. What Garrett did not know is that he was actually hypnotized by Elektra when he was really in dismantled form when held in a stasis tube in a S.H.I.E.L.D. facility. Trapped in the delusion caused by Elektra, Garrett believed that he was meeting a Russian leader.

Garrett was still in storage while still believing that he is the President.

Agents from the Snakeroot raided the S.H.I.E.L.D. facility as Tekagi broke Garrett out of his stasis tube during their escape. At the Snakeroot's stronghold, Tekagi revealed that a part of Elektra is in Garrett where it was merged with him on the plane of the mind. Tekagi drew the dark essence out of Garrett and placed into the mind of a new warrior of the Snakeroot as the shadow warriors initiated the process. As the Snakeroot continued the process of transferring the dark essence into a female corpse that was reanimated as Erynys, the technicians present worked on rebuilding Garrett. The rebuilt Garrett and Erynys stood before the Snakeroot where Garrett insulted Eddie Pasim (who was involved with the About Face Virus which the Hand seeks to make the presence of Erynys permanent) until Erynys commanded him to be quiet. Garrett and Erynys are sent to attack Daredevil and Chaste member Stone as Garrett continued to confuse Erynys with Elektra. When the real Elektra showed up, it caused pain in both Garrett and Erynys where Garrett followed Erynys' orders to flee. Garrett and Erynys accompanied the Snakeroot and the Hand into forcing Eddie Pasim to relocate the missing sample of the About Face Virus. Garrett defended Erynys when she was criticized for her failure to kill Daredevil. During the Snakeroot's fight with Daredevil and Elektra over the About Face Virus's sample, Garrett was still confused over Elektra and Erynys. After Erynys was killed by Daredevil enabling the dark essence to possess Elektra again, Garrett was apprehended by S.H.I.E.L.D. and placed in S.H.I.E.L.D. Detention Cell #7. On the S.H.I.E.L.D. Helicarrier, Fury questioned Garrett about what happened.

Fury reactivated Garrett's status as a S.H.I.E.L.D. Agent and had the cyber-warrior Siege keep an eye on him.

When Garrett attempted for unemployment, he left past employment empty and was thrown out when they thought he was lying about working as a S.H.I.E.L.D. Agent. Garrett then visited Karen Page's apartment where he used his optic lasers to kill the cockroaches as part of demonstrating his credentials to Karen.

Following the Civil War storyline, Tony Stark considered Garrett a potential recruit for the Fifty State Initiative.

During the Dark Reign storyline, Garrett was listed as an unaffiliated S.H.I.E.L.D. Agent in S.H.I.E.L.D.'s agent files. Garrett had stopped drinking and had moved to Toronto where he opened Natchios' Total Car Pit where he worked under the supervision of another former S.H.I.E.L.D. Agent. Garrett was later visited by Fury who called him out of retirement. Garrett went with Fury to Alexandria, Virginia where they had coffee. During this time, Fury showed Garrett a file of former S.H.I.E.L.D. Agent Seth Waters who is now working for the Department of Treasury with his suspicions that he is a double agent. Garrett is sent by Fury to find Seth Waters to see if he is working for HYDRA or someone else. Garrett went to the Department of Treasury to talk to Seth Waters who was surprised that he did not set off the metal detectors. He told Garrett was he knows. Garrett flew Fury to Avengers Tower in one of the flying cars where Fury had told Norman Osborn that Seth Waters was a national security issue resulting in his capture by H.A.M.M.E.R. As Bullseye interrogated Garrett and Seth Waters, Fury sniped Seth Waters after he mentioned that he was working for Leviathan. Garrett and Fury then escaped while evading the H.A.M.M.E.R. Agents. Fury and Garrett then traveled to Rome to the Pieta base where they logged into the systems to find out what they know about Leviathan and the Great Wheel.

At the Pieta base, Fury discussed with Dum Dum Dugan, Garrett, and the Professor to discuss their next action against HYDRA and Leviathan. Garrett told Fury not to hesitate because now was not the time to end HYDRA and Leviathan. Garrett traveled to Sudan where he met with Steve Rogers, Sharon Carter and Fury at Fury's Sandbox for one last party together. Garrett then listened to the Howling Commandos members' stories and had a good laugh. Garrett then participate in a toast to the Howling Commandos' fallen members.

Garrett visited Sebastian Druid at his apartment in Hawaii to tell him that there is no out of the Secret Warriors. Garrett got Sebastian Druid into good shape and was allowed to prove himself in the field. He took Sebastian to China to use magic to make two destroyed Helicarriers from a recent battle with HYDRA disappear and then sped up their corrosion. Although he was impressed, Garrett wanted to know if Sebastian Druid was working under the pressure. Then he took Sebastian Druid to Leviathan's Ursa Major base where he created a magic bullet that Garrett used to kill Leviathan's leader Magadane as the magical component of the bullet was sprayed on HYDRA's sign in order sow dissension between HYDRA and Leviathan. At Fury's Excalibur base, Garrett told Sebastian Druid that Hellfire and Phobos died in battle with Daisy Johnson stating Fury's suspicions that Hellfire was a traitor all along. After Fury told him that the Secret Warriors would be broken up, Garrett congratulated Sebastian Druid for his hard work.

Garrett was with Fury when they rode a limo to pick up Dum Dum Dugan and Jasper Sitwell at the UN White Box Facility. Shortly after that, Garrett rejoined the ranks of S.H.I.E.L.D. under Daisy Johnson's leadership.

During the Avengers: Standoff! storyline, Garrett was present during the attack on A.I.M. Island to reclaim Rick Jones from the New Avengers. He served as Songbird's supervisor.

Powers and abilities
John Garrett is a trained agent of S.H.I.E.L.D., and a skilled marksman. As a cyborg, approximately 80% of his body is replaced with S.H.I.E.L.D. cybernetics with only his head and a few of his organs still being natural. He has plastic skin and metal alloy bones, with his muscular system consisting of a combination of pneumatics, hydraulics, and internal electrical generators. His cyborg body grants him enhanced strength, speed, stamina, durability, regeneration, and agility.

In other media
John Garrett appears in the Marvel Cinematic Universe series Agents of S.H.I.E.L.D., portrayed by Bill Paxton. Introduced in the season one episode "T.A.H.I.T.I.", this version is a high-level S.H.I.E.L.D. agent/munitions expert and a former cohort of Phil Coulson who works alongside Grant Ward and Melinda May. However, he is later revealed to be a high-ranking Hydra sleeper agent known as "The Clairvoyant" and Project Centipede's mastermind in the episode "Turn, Turn, Turn". Garrett is also the Deathlok program's first test subject who is dying as a result of failed organs. In the episode "Beginning of the End", after being rejuvenated with Kree blood, a crazed Garrett engages Coulson in battle before the latter receives help from Nick Fury and Mike Peterson. The three defeat him, but Garrett escapes and upgrades himself, only to be killed by Coulson. A younger alternate timeline version, portrayed by James Paxton, is introduced in the season seven episode "Stolen". Nathaniel Malick recruits him after telling him of his future and grants him teleportation powers from the Inhuman Gordon. After Malick leaves him for dead during the series finale however, Garrett sides with S.H.I.E.L.D. and helps them regroup following a Chronicom attack before he is killed by Victoria Hand, who mistook him for a threat.

References

External links
 John Garrett at Marvel Wiki
 John Garrett at Comic Vine
 

Characters created by Bill Sienkiewicz
Characters created by Frank Miller (comics)
Comics characters introduced in 1986
Fictional presidents of the United States
Marvel Comics television characters
S.H.I.E.L.D. agents